Andriy Konyushenko (born 2 April 1977) is a professional Ukrainian football defender who plays for FC Poltava in the Ukrainian First League. He was acquired from Zorya Luhansk during the 2008–09 summer transfer season.

External links 

 Official Website Profile

1977 births
Living people
Ukrainian footballers
Ukrainian Premier League players
Ukrainian First League players
Ukrainian Second League players
FC Obolon-Brovar Kyiv players
FC Metalurh Zaporizhzhia players
FC Shakhtar Donetsk players
FC Mariupol players
FC Metalist Kharkiv players
FC Volyn Lutsk players
FC Zorya Luhansk players
FC Poltava players
Association football defenders
Footballers from Kyiv